Scopula omnisona is a moth of the  family Geometridae. It is found in Madagascar.

The fore wings are pale pinkish-grey or violet-grey with a few scattered black scales.

Subspecies
Scopula omnisona omnisona
Scopula omnisona septentrionis Herbulot, 1972

References

Moths described in 1915
omnisona
Moths of Madagascar
Moths of Africa